The 2008–09 Louisville Cardinals men's basketball team represented the University of Louisville during the 2008–09 NCAA Division I men's basketball season, Louisville's 95th season of intercollegiate competition. The Cardinals competed in the Big East Conference and were coached by Rick Pitino, who was in his eighth season. The team played its home games at Freedom Hall.

The Cardinals finished the season 31–6, 16–2 and were regular season Big East Champions (their 1st).  They defeated Syracuse 76–66 to win the 2009 Big East men's basketball tournament (their 1st). They received an automatic bid to the 2009 NCAA Division I men's basketball tournament, earning the overall #1 seed and were placed in the Midwest Region. They were upset by #2 seed Michigan State in the Midwest Regional final, 64–52.

Preseason 
After an elite eight appearance in the 2008 tournament, Louisville entered the 2008–09 season ranked third in both the AP and Coaches polls in part due to a strong recruiting class.  The incoming freshman class is ranked fifth overall by Scouts.com, led by number one ranked center Samardo Samuels.  Louisville has been picked by many analysts to be a potential Final Four contender, including Sports Illustrated and Dick Vitale.

Regular season 
Despite the #3 preseason ranking, Louisville struggled in the non-conference losing to three unranked opponents.  After beating Kentucky on an Edgar Sosa buzzer-beating three pointer, Louisville entered Big East play ranked #21.  After beating South Florida easily, Louisville beat three straight ranked teams in close games: #17 Villanova, #12 Notre Dame in overtime, and previously unbeaten #1 Pittsburgh.  Louisville would continue strong play, going undefeated in January and winning its first eight conference games before losing to #1 Connecticut on February 2.  After beating St. John's, Louisville lost by their most lopsided margin since joining the Big East, a 33-point drubbing by Notre Dame.  After that game, Louisville won its final seven regular season games to win the school's first ever regular season Big East championship.

Big East tournament 
By virtue of their outright regular-season title, Louisville received a double-bye in the Big East tournament and played their first game in the tournament quarterfinals.  In the tournament, Louisville beat Providence 73–55 in the quarterfinals and #10 Villanova 69–55 in the semifinals to advance to the school's first ever Big East tournament championship game in four seasons in the conference. In the finals, Louisville won its first Big East tournament Championship, defeating #18 Syracuse 76–66.  Due to losses in the early conference tournament rounds by several teams above them, the Cardinals finished #1 in the final regular season AP and coaches' polls—the first time in school history they have been ranked #1 in either poll.

NCAA tournament
Louisville was awarded the top seed in the NCAA tournament Midwest Region, as well as the overall #1 seed in the tournament.  This is Louisville's second ever 1-seed.  The Cardinals beat Morehead St. and Siena in the first two tournament rounds, advancing to face Arizona in the Sweet 16 on March 27.  After beating Arizona by 39 points, Louisville faced Michigan St. in the Elite Eight and lost 64–52.

Roster

Schedule

|-
!colspan=12 style=|Exhibition games

|-
!colspan=12 style=|Non-conference games

|-
!colspan=12 style=| Big East regular season

|-
!colspan=12 style=| Big East tournament

|-
!colspan=12 style=| NCAA tournament

Rankings

References 

Louisville Cardinals
Louisville Cardinals men's basketball seasons
Louisville
Louisville Cardinals men's basketball, 2008-09
Louisville Cardinals men's basketball